The 1948–49 Duke Blue Devils men's basketball team represented Duke University during the 1948–49 men's college basketball season. The head coach was Gerry Gerard, coaching his seventh season with the Blue Devils. The team finished with an overall record of 13–9.

References 

Duke Blue Devils men's basketball seasons
Duke
1948 in sports in North Carolina
1949 in sports in North Carolina